Toy theater, also called paper theater and model theater (also spelt theatre, see spelling differences), is a form of miniature theater dating back to the early 19th century in Europe. Toy theaters were often printed on paperboard sheets and sold as kits at the concession stand of an opera house, playhouse, or vaudeville theater. Toy theatres were assembled at home and performed for family members and guests, sometimes with live musical accompaniment. Toy theatre saw a drastic decline in popularity with a shift towards realism on the European stage in the late 19th century, and again with the arrival of television after World War II. Toy theatre has seen a resurgence in recent years among many puppeteers, authors and filmmakers and there are numerous international toy theatre festivals throughout the Americas and Europe.

History

Late 18th and early 19th century
The original toy theatres were mass-produced replicas of popular plays, sold as kits that people assembled at home, including stage, scenery, characters and costumes. They were printed on paperboard, available at English playhouses and commercial libraries for "a penny plain or two pence coloured." Hobbyists often went to great pains to not only hand-colour their stages but to embellish their toy theatre personae with bits of cloth and tinsel; tinsel print characters could be bought pre-tinselled, or a wide range of supplies for home tinselling could be bought. Just as the toy-sized stages diminished a play's scale, their corresponding scripts tended to abridge the text, paring it down to key characters and lines for a shorter, less complicated presentation.

In the first half of the 19th century, more than 300 of London's most popular plays saw the issue as toy theatres. Publishers sent artists to the playhouses of Georgian and early-Victorian London to record the scenery, costumes and dramatic attitudes of the greatest successes of the day. The theatre management often provided these artists with a free seat, as the toy theatre sheets were excellent free advertising.

Late 19th and early 20th century
Stage theater of the early 19th century had been based more on spectacle than on depth of plot or character, and these characteristics lent themselves effectively to the format of toy theater. Toward the end of the 19th century, European popular drama had shifted its preference to the trend of realism, marking a dramaturgical swing toward psychological complexity, character motivation and settings using ordinary three-dimensional scenic elements. This trend in stage theater did not make an easy conversion to its toy counterpart, and with the fanciful dramas of fifty years prior being out of fashion, the toy theaters that remained in print fell into obsolescence. 

Despite its fall in popularity, toy theater remained in the realm of influential artists who championed its resurgence. In 1884 British author Robert Louis Stevenson wrote an essay in tribute of toy theater's tiny grandeur entitled "Penny Plain, Twopence Coloured" in which he extolled the virtues of the dramas supplied by Pollock's. Other children's authors like Lewis Carroll and Hans Christian Andersen also dabbled in toy theater, as did Oscar Wilde. The brothers Jack and William Butler Yeats both used toy theaters as mock-ups for their work in art and stagecraft. In the 20th century toy theater became a tool for the avant-garde, messed with by futurist founder F.T. Marienetti as well as Pablo Picasso. Film directors like Ingmar Bergman and Orson Welles would use toy theaters as staging grounds for their cinematic masterpieces, and Laurence Olivier even made a toy theater of his film version of Hamlet, mass-produced with a little paper cutout of himself in the starring role.  But after its second wave boom, toy theater fell into a second recession, replaced in the 1950s, by a different box in people's sitting rooms that needed no live operator and whose sets, characters, stories and musical numbers were beamed in electronically from miles away to be projected on the glass of a cathode ray tube: television.

Late 20th and early 21st century

Toy theater has been enjoying a revival in recent decades. Collectors and traditionalists perform restored versions of Victorian plays while experimental puppeteers push the form's limits, adapting the works of Isaac Babel and Italo Calvino, as well as that of unsung storytellers, friends, neighbors, relatives, and themselves. Contemporary toy theater may use any available technology and cover any subject, and numerous international toy theater festivals occur regularly throughout the Americas and Europe, attracting many well-known actors, musicians and authors to their stages.

Construction and format
Mass-produced toy theaters are usually sold as printed sheets, either in black and white to be colored as desired, or as full-color images of the proscenium, scenery, sets, props and characters. The sheets are pasted onto thin cardboard, cut out, and then assembled for the purposes of the reenacting of a play. Figures are attached to small sticks, wires, or configurations of strings that allow them to move about the set. Some toy theaters and figures are enhanced with moving parts and special effects, and it is common for performances to include live or pre-recorded sound effects and music.

In modern media
 Adam Keen, when proprietor of the Pollock Toy Shop, published a toy theatre version of Laurence Olivier's film of Hamlet (1948) with characters and a short playscript.
 A toy theater appears near the end of The Railway Children (1970 film).
 Author/artist Edward Gorey designed a mass-produced toy theater based on his set designs for the 1977 stage production of Dracula.
 A toy theater is featured at the beginning of Ingmar Bergman's award-winning 1982 film Fanny and Alexander.
 Carroll Ballard and Maurice Sendak's 1986 film version of The Nutcracker featured toy theater.
 Set designer Heidi Landesman based her designs for the 1991 musical The Secret Garden on toy theatres.
 Julie Taymor used toy theater puppets in a scene for the 2002 film Frida.
 Sean Meredith's comedic Dante's Inferno (2007) is an entire toy theater film.
 Toy theaters are a motif in a number of Jan Švankmajer's films.
 A toy theater is featured at the conclusion of Terry Gilliam's 2009 film The Imaginarium of Doctor Parnassus, both as a feature of the plot and the format of the end credits.
 In the 2011 horror-themed video game, Shadows of the Damned, players battle against a demon in a toy theater like screen with characters appearing as toy theater puppets for the level.
 The 2019 Japanese film Violence Voyager claims to use a new technique called 'gekimation' (taken from the Japanese word 'gekiga' which is a term for adult manga).  However, the "animation" style is more in line with toy theater.

Notable people who have dabbled in toy theater
 Hans Christian Andersen, Danish author
 Jane Austen, British novelist
 Edmund Bacon, American city planner
 Peter Baldwin, actor and owner of Benjamin Pollock's Toy Shop
 Ingmar Bergman, Swedish film, stage and opera director
 Jim Copp and Ed Brown, American producers of children's records
 James Burke, British science historian
 Edward Gordon Craig, British designer, theorist, theatre practitioner
 Lewis Carroll, British author
 Karl Dane, American silent film actor
 Thomas John Dibdin, British dramatist and songwriter
 Charles Dickens (1812–1870), British novelist
 Ian Falconer, American children's book author/illustrator and theater designer
 Ralph Fiennes, British actor
 Lynn Fontanne, British actor
 W. S. Gilbert, British playwright
 Terry Gilliam, American animator and film director
 Johann Wolfgang von Goethe, German author
 Edward Gorey, American author
 Alfred Lunt, American actor
 Filippo Tommaso Marinetti, Italian poet and founder of the Futurist movement
 Ian McKellen, British actor
 Michel Ocelot, French writer and director of animated films
 Laurence Olivier, British actor
 Pablo Picasso, Spanish painter and sculptor
 J. B. Priestley (1894–1984), English novelist, playwright and broadcaster
 Brian Selznick, American children's book author
 Edwin Smith, British photographer
 Robert Louis Stevenson, British author
 Jan Švankmajer, Czech animator and filmmaker
 Andrew Lloyd Webber, British composer
 Orson Welles, actor and director of radio dramas and films
 Oscar Wilde, British author
 Jack Butler Yeats, Irish artist
 William Butler Yeats, Irish poet, dramatist and literary luminary
 Paul Zaloom, American puppeteer and children's television host

See also
 Puppetry
 Kamishibai
 Little Theatre Movement
Pollock's Toy Museum
Benjamin Pollock's Toy Shop

ToyTheater.com – Website with educational games for children.

References

External links
The collection of Lucía Contreras in English and Spanish
Toy Theatre Representation of Dante's Inferno
Arthur Weyhe toy theatre collection, 1812–1895, held by the Billy Rose Theatre Division, New York Public Library for the Performing Arts

Theatrical genres
19th-century theatre
Theatre
Puppetry
Paper art
Paper toys